Roma Shane Ryan (born 20 January 1954 in Belfast) is an Irish writer, poet, and lyricist, currently living in Killiney, Ireland, with her husband Nicky Ryan. Ryan is the primary lyricist for the singer Enya, who has stated that the importance of the Ryans' contributions are such that without them, Enya would not exist.

Biography and work with Enya
Roma Ryan (nee Shane) and Nicky Ryan met Enya in 1978; Nicky Ryan was managing Enya's family's band Clannad. Enya had just finished secondary school when Nicky Ryan rang her, asking if she would become a member of the group. The Ryans and Enya left Clannad several years later to focus on their own musical careers. Enya originally wrote instrumental melodies. Ryan found these melodies "very visual" and suited to film work; she began to write lyrics to them.

Her lyrics can be heard in films such as The Frog Prince (1984), Green Card (1990), L.A. Story (1991), Toys (1992), Cry, the Beloved Country (1995), and Calmi Cuori Appassionati (2001), all of which feature Enya's music. Ryan's lyrics for Enya have won Grammy Awards; the song "May It Be" for The Lord of the Rings film The Fellowship of the Ring was nominated for an Oscar.

Loxian language
In 2005, Ryan revealed her creation of a new language, known as Loxian, in Enya's album Amarantine. It was inspired by J.R.R. Tolkien's Elvish language, . This language can be heard on three tracks from "Amarantine": "Less Than a Pearl", "The River Sings" and "Water Shows the Hidden Heart". Enya has mentioned in interviews that Ryan developed Loxian while writing lyrics for the track "Water Shows the Hidden Heart"; she and Enya had attempted to write lyrics for the track in Latin, Gaelic and English, but in the end found that they didn't really work for the song. The first Loxian phrase created by Ryan—"Syoombraaya"—is the title of that track ("Water Shows the Hidden Heart").

Loxian language was used again in Enya's eighth studio album, Dark Sky Island, released on 20 November 2015, on the songs 'The Forge Of Angels' and 'The Loxian Gates'. These songs in particular focus on the otherworldly and futuristic tales Ryan uses Loxian for, along with the non-Loxian Astra et Luna.

Solo work 
Ryan has undertaken several projects without Enya, including a book describing the Loxian language called Water Shows the Hidden Heart. The book also contains poetry and stories written by Ryan. "Water Shows the Hidden Heart" was released in two editions: the first edition as a standalone item, shortly after the release of Amarantine in 2005. The first edition features a short introduction by Enya. The second edition was included on the Deluxe Collector's Edition of Amarantine boxed set in early 2006. It omitted Enya's introduction and added colour images, as well as containing a different selection of Ryan's poetry. Neither version is in print.

On 1 September 2017 Ryan published two books, Islands No 2&3: Dark Sky Islands and Little Histories and The Messenger's Origin. The first book focuses on the poetry Ryan wrote for the Enya album, Dark Sky Island. The other, a book of poetry, is part of The Loxian Games. As of 21 August 2017, several winners of the Loxian Games have received their books and posted photos of the autographed copies on Unity - Enya's official forum. Enya, Ryan, and her husband all autographed the books presented to the winners. The books were published by Valley-dwellers Publishing.

The Loxian Games and the Unity forum
Ryan has been the coordinator of two on-line competitions at Enya's official website, enya.com—the First and Second Loxian Games, which have both been completed. Ryan announced the games on the official website in August 2008; the first games began on 1 September 2008 and the second games in September of the following year. Ryan stated: "The Games are a series of treasure hunts and you can tell by the name that they're based on the Loxian language you heard on Amarantine. They are games of riddles and clues and of you, looking for answers. As with most treasure hunts – there are prizes to be won. As with most treasure hunts you do not know what prize you may have won!" The winners for both games had been announced on the official forum, unity.enya.com. Enya announced the last winners of the games in a video message from 2017.  Prior to the closing of the sites, Roma had provided the majority of Aigle's contact with fans on the official website and also communicated periodically on the Unity forum. It is uncertain, but possible that the Loxian Games would re-emerge in some form during the era of an upcoming Enya album.

Personal life
Ryan and her husband have two daughters, Ebony and Persia, who also contributed artwork and layout to Amarantine.

Discography
1985 — The Frog Prince: The Original Soundtrack Recording — Enya and other artists
1987 — Enya — Enya
1988 — Watermark — Enya
1991 — Shepherd Moons — Enya
1995 — The Memory of Trees — Enya
1997 — Paint the Sky with Stars — Enya
2000 — A Day Without Rain — Enya
2001 — The Lord of the Rings: The Fellowship of the Ring [Original Motion Picture Soundtrack]
2005 — Amarantine — Enya
2006 — Sounds of the Season: The Enya Holiday Collection — Enya
2008 — And Winter Came... — Enya
2009 — The Very Best of Enya — Enya
2015 — Dark Sky Island — Enya

References

External links
Roma Ryan – The Official Website
Valley-dwellers Publishing
Enya Lyrics site

Irish songwriters
Musicians from Belfast
Living people
Irish women poets
21st-century writers from Northern Ireland
21st-century women writers from Northern Ireland
People from Artane, Dublin
1950 births